Yukio Takano ( Takano Yukio; 25 December 1937 – 9 February 2023) was a Japanese businessman and politician, member of the Liberal Democratic Party.

Biography
He served in the Tokyo Metropolitan Assembly from 1989 to 1999. He was also mayor of Toshima from 1999 to 2023.

Takano died of COVID-19 in Tokyo on 9 February 2023, at the age of 85.

References

1937 births
2023 deaths
Members of the Tokyo Metropolitan Assembly
Mayors of places in Japan
Liberal Democratic Party (Japan) politicians
Rikkyo University alumni
People from Toshima
Deaths from the COVID-19 pandemic in Japan